The Bangalore geckoella (Cyrtodactylus srilekhae) is a species of nocturnal terrestrial gecko, a lizard in the family Gekkonidae. The species is endemic to India.

Etymology
The specific name, srilekhae, is in honor of Srilekha Agarwal, who is the mother of the binomial authority.

Geographic range
C. srilekhae is found in the Eastern Ghats and parts of hilly surrounding terrain, in Mysore plateau. It is recorded from the outskirts of the city of Bangalore  and adjacent regions, along the borders of Karnataka and Tamil Nadu states (in the Melagiri hills), in South India.

Habitat
C. srilekhae inhabits dense leaf-litter and hides under stones on the forest floor of mixed deciduous forest tracts on hill slopes.

Description
It is often confused with C. collegalensis.

Reproduction
C. srilekhae is oviparous.

References

Cyrtodactylus
Reptiles described in 2016